Tennis Canada is the national governing body of tennis within Canada.  It works together with the provincial associations to organize tournaments and rules.  They also oversee the Canada Davis Cup team and the Canada Fed Cup team. Tennis Canada was formed in 1890 and is a full member of the International Tennis Federation (ITF). Tennis Canada operates under the auspices of Sport Canada, and is a member of the Canadian Olympic Association. Tennis Canada’s event management team is directly responsible for all national and international competitions in Canada, including junior, senior and wheelchair championships.

History
The Canadian Lawn Tennis Association (CLTA) was formed on July 1, 1890, in Toronto, Ontario. Delegates were present from at least thirteen clubs: six Toronto tennis clubs, including the Toronto Lawn Tennis Club; two clubs from Montreal, Quebec; and clubs from London, Ottawa, St. Catharines, Peterboro, and Petrolea, all in Ontario. Charles Smith Hyman, who won the Canadian Championships (later known as the Canadian Open) singles title five times in the 1880s, was chosen as its first president and served three one-year terms (1890–1892). The CLTA began organizing the Canadian Championships at the Toronto Lawn Tennis Club, starting with the 1890 tournament. They adopted the rules of the All England Lawn Tennis Club, the club which hosts Wimbledon. Beginning in 1894, the CLTA began organizing a junior championship for boys 18 years old and under.

In the first quarter century of its existence, two men served lengthy terms as president of the CLTA: Henry Gordon MacKenzie for eight years (1893–1900), and A. C. McMaster for thirteen years (1904–1916). The International Lawn Tennis Federation (ILTF) was formed in 1913, and the CLTA was invited to be a founding member but declined. In 1915, with many players fighting in World War I, the CLTA decided to suspend Canadian participation in the Davis Cup and also suspend the Canadian Championships. During the war, Canadian tournaments were suspended, except where "the entire proceeds were devoted to the Red Cross or other patriotic funds". In 1919, the CLTA resumed Canadian tournaments, but passed resolutions restricting Canadian players from competing "in tournaments authorized by Germans, Austrians, Turks, or Bulgarians" (i.e. Central Powers) and barring players from those nations from competing in Canadian tournaments. In 1920, Canada sought to return to Davis Cup play, but issued a late withdrawal citing an inability "to secure players of Davis Cup calibre".

Garnett H. Meldrum was president of the CLTA for twelve years (1922–1933). Meldrum, who had previously been a founding member of the Ontario Lawn Tennis Association, boosted the international prestige of the Canadian Championships and began moving the tournament around Canada. The 1931 tournament, for example, was held in Vancouver, British Columbia. In 1922, the CLTA began publishing a magazine, Canadian Lawn Tennis; the first issue included the complete rules governing Canadian tennis. By 1927, the CLTA had joined the ILTF. In 1928, Meldrum proposed that one junior boy from each province be sent to the Canadian Championships as a means of stimulating improvement in their game. At that time, there were 366 clubs and over 24,000 players affiliated with the CLTA. Robert N. Watt served as president for nine years (1937–1945), and later became the first Canadian president of the ILTF in 1957. In 1938, the CLTA formed a national player development commission.

During World War II, the CLTA suspended participation in the Davis Cup and also suspended the Canadian Championships. As during the first world war, war-benefit tournaments were held in Canada.

In 1975, Josef Brabenec Sr. was named the first Canadian national tennis coach. During his tenure, he designed national junior development and national coaching certification programs. In 1976, the CLTA began renting a  site on the grounds of York University in Toronto for one dollar per year, for the purpose of building a million-dollar five-court tennis centre, to be the home of the Canadian Open tournament.

Structure
The organizational membership is made up of ten provincial and two territorial associations: Tennis Alberta, Tennis BC, Tennis Manitoba, Tennis New Brunswick, Tennis Newfoundland & Labrador, Tennis Nova Scotia, Ontario Tennis Association, Tennis Prince Edward Island, Tennis Quebec, Tennis Saskatchewan, Tennis Yukon, and Tennis Northwest Territories.

As of 2017, the Chair of the Board is Derrick Rowe, while the President and Chief Executive Officer is Michael S. Downey. Directors include Marc Bibeau, Jennifer Bishop, Jack Graham (emeritus), Richard Harris, Sébastien Leblanc, Stephen Mandel, Nadir Mohamed and Mike Tevlin.

Development
Tennis Canada operates a junior national training program through three centers: at IGA Stadium in Montreal; at Aviva Centre in Toronto; and at the North Shore Winter Club in Vancouver.

Tournaments

Tennis Canada owns and operates the Canadian Open (marketed as the National Bank Open Presented by Rogers since 2021), a joint men's and women's competition which attracts the top players in the world. For men, the Canadian Open is a Masters 1000 event on the Association of Tennis Professionals (ATP) tour; for women, it is a WTA 1000 event on the Women's Tennis Association (WTA) tour. In even-numbered years, the men's tournament is held in Montreal, while the women's tournament is held in Toronto, and vice versa in odd-numbered years.

Tennis Canada also owns and operates six ATP Challenger Tour tournaments in Drummondville, Winnipeg, Gatineau, Granby, Vancouver, and Calgary; and several lower-level ITF-sanctioned professional tournaments for men and women.

At the junior level, Tennis Canada operates eight junior national championships for Canadian juniors each year, including both indoor and outdoor events in four age categories: under-12, under-14, under-16, and under-18. They also host several ITF-sanctioned junior tournaments from Grade 1 to Grade 5 open to international players. The largest of these is the Grade 1 level Canadian Open Junior Tennis Championships held in Repentigny, Quebec.

International tennis

Tennis Canada is responsible for organizing Canadian teams for the Fed Cup, Davis Cup, Hopman Cup, the Olympics, and Paralympics.

Rogers rankings
Tennis Canada, in partnership with the Provincial Tennis Associations, launched Rogers Rankings on January 1, 2009. This new and enhanced ranking system is based on the proven Elo rating system used for ranking chess players and has been developed and used with exceptional accuracy by the Quebec Tennis Federation for over twenty-five years. The Rogers Rankings allows all competitors to compare themselves to the nation’s top players. Similar systems have also been in use in Spain and France. The Rogers Rankings system awards points to players based on quality of wins (i.e. head-to-head results) versus rounds won in a tournament. The system generates accurate rankings due to its ability to evaluate the calibre of competing players. Based on this premise, the stronger player is expected to win while the weaker player is expected to lose. Players are ranked according to points accumulated in national, provincial and international tournaments sanctioned by the Tennis Canada ranking committee. Player points are used to compute a national and provincial ranking. To ensure accuracy, Tennis Canada and the PTAs began testing the system internally on January 1, 2008.  The system was computerized in partnership between Tennis Canada and Computan, a development company that helped build ranking systems for many Canadian sports organizations.

Hall of fame

Players

Aleksandra Wozniak 2022
Andrée Martin 1995
Andrew Sznajder 2002
Ann Barclay 1994
B.P. Schwengers 1991
Bob Murray 1994
Brendan Macken 1991
Carling Bassett-Seguso 1998
Charles Hyman 1991
Dale Power 2006
Daniel Nestor 2018
Delano Osborne 1991
Don Fontana 2000
Eleanor Young 1993
Faye Urban 1996
Florence Best 1995
Gilbert Nunns 1995
Glenn Michibata 1999
Grant Connell 1998
Harry Fauquier 1996
Helen Kelesi 2002
Henri Rochon 1991
Isidore F. Hellmuth 1991
Dr. Jack A. Wright 1991
Jane O'Hara 2002
Jill Hetherington Hultquist 2001
Keith Carpenter 1996
Laird Watt 1991
Lois Moyes Bickle 1991
Lorne Main 1991
Louise Brown 1991
Marcel Rainville 1993
Marjorie Blackwood 1998
Marjorie Leeming 1993
Martin Wostenholme 2003
Mike Belkin 1994
Olive Wade 1993
Patricia Hy-Boulais 2004
R.B. Powell 1993
Réjean Genois 1999
Rene Simpson 2011
Robert Bédard 1991
Robert Watt 1991
Sébastien Lareau 2005
Sonya Jeyaseelan 2011
Dr. Susan Butt 2000
Vicki Berner 1995
Violet Summerhayes 1991
Walter Martin 2006
Willard Crocker 1991

Builders

Bob Moffatt 2015
Bruce and Betty Birmingham 2020
Doug Philpott 1993
 Eddie Condon 1993
 Hon. François Godbout 1996
Frank Flanagan 1994
Garnett Meldrum 1995
 Harold Milavsky 2009
 Harry Marpole 1994
 Jack Graham 2020
Jacqueline Boutet C.M. 2003
 Jacques Hérisset 2001
James Kirkpatrick 1994
 Jim Fleck O.C. 2004
 Jim Skelton 1994
 John Beddington 2006
 Josef Brabenec Sr. 2000
Ken Sinclair 1996
Klaus Bindhart 1996
Lawrence Strong C.M. 1995
Louis Cayer 2013
Lucien Laverdure 1995
Maurice Leclerc 2002
Peter Dimmer 1993
Pierre Lamarche 2004
Richard Legendre 2007
Ron Ghitter 2022
 Robert Wright 2000
Roy Mansell 1994
Tom Tebbutt 2022

Corporate Shield 

 Paul Paré 2006
 Wilmat Tennyson 2006

References
Notes

Sources
 
Footnotes

External links
Tennis Canada

National members of the International Tennis Federation
Sports governing bodies in Canada
 
Sports organizations established in 1890
1890 establishments in Canada